|}

The Lennox Stakes is a Group 2 flat horse race in Great Britain open to horses aged three years or older. It is run at Goodwood over a distance of 7 furlongs (1,408 metres), and it is scheduled to take place each year in late July or early August.

History
The event is named after the Duke of Lennox, one of the dukedoms held by the Duke of Richmond, the owner of Goodwood Racecourse. It was established in 2000, and the inaugural running was won by Observatory. It replaced the Beeswing Stakes, a discontinued race at Newcastle.

The Lennox Stakes was initially classed at Group 3 level, and it was promoted to Group 2 status in 2003. It was sponsored by Betfair from 2004 to 2010, and during this period it was known as the Betfair Cup. It was sponsored by Bet365 from 2011 to 2014.

The race is currently held on the opening day of the five-day Glorious Goodwood meeting.

Records
<div style="font-size:90%">
Most successful horse (2 wins):
 Nayyir – 2002, 2003
 Sir Dancealot - 2018, 2019

Leading jockey (2 wins):
 Eddie Ahern – Nayyir (2002, 2003)
 Kerrin McEvoy – Byron (2004), Tariq (2007)
 Richard Hughes – Paco Boy (2008), Strong Suit (2011)
 Tom Queally - Lord Shanakill (2010), Chachamaidee (2012)
 Gerald Mosse - Sir Dancealot (2018, 2019)

Leading trainer (2 wins):
 Marcus Tregoning – Fath (2001), Finjaan (2009)
 Gerard Butler – Nayyir (2002, 2003)
 Saeed bin Suroor – Byron (2004), Iffraaj (2006)
 Richard Hannon Sr. – Paco Boy (2008), Strong Suit (2011)
 Sir Henry Cecil - Lord Shanakill (2010), Chachamaidee (2012)
 David Elsworth - Sir Dancealot (2018, 2019)
</div>

Winners

See also
 Horse racing in Great Britain
 List of British flat horse races

References
 Racing Post:

 galopp-sieger.de – Lennox Stakes. ifhaonline.org – International Federation of Horseracing Authorities – Lennox Stakes (2019). pedigreequery.com – Lennox Stakes – Goodwood.''

Flat races in Great Britain
Goodwood Racecourse
Open mile category horse races
Recurring sporting events established in 2000
2000 establishments in England